Boediono (EYD: Budiono, pronounced ; born 25 February 1943) is an Indonesian economist and statesman. He was the 11th vice president of Indonesia, in office from 2009 to 2014. He became vice president after winning the 2009 presidential election together with the then-incumbent President Susilo Bambang Yudhoyono. Prior to this he had been the Governor of the Indonesian Central Bank and a professor of economics at Gadjah Mada University.

Education
Boediono received his early education in primary school in Blitar, East Java. In the early 1960s he began university studies at Gadjah Mada University in Yogyakarta before winning a scholarship to study at the University of Western Australia in Perth.  In 1967 he graduated from the University of Western Australia with an economics degree and continued his studies for a master's degree in economics at Monash University in Melbourne which he completed in 1972.  Later, he undertook further studies towards his doctorate degree from the Wharton School of the University of Pennsylvania which he completed in 1979. He also worked in the Indonesia Project at the Australian National University in the early 1970s as a research assistant in economics.

Boediono was listed as one of the Wharton School's 125 Influential People and Ideas in 2007 and was dubbed "Indonesia's financial rudder".

Career

Boediono was a Bank of Indonesia deputy governor in charge of fiscal monetary policy from 1997 to 1998 and served as State Minister of National Planning and Development from 1998 to October 1999.

Following the removal of Abdurrahman Wahid from the presidency in 2001, President Megawati Sukarnoputri appointed Boediono as Minister of Finance in her new administration. Under his leadership, the economy grew by 4% in 2002.

President Susilo Bambang Yudhoyono appointed Boediono as Coordinating Minister for the Economy during his first cabinet reshuffle in 2005, replacing Aburizal Bakrie. Bakrie had come under suspicion for having conflicts of interest. In 2008, a commission of the People's Representative Council elected Boediono Governor of the Indonesian central bank, Bank Indonesia. After he was selected by Yudhoyono as a running mate in the 2009 presidential election, Boediono submitted his resignation from the central bank post.

Boediono is also a professor of economics at Gadjah Mada University where he has taught various courses on macroeconomics and monetary policy since the early 1970s.

Honorary degrees

Boediono has received honorary degrees from the three Australian universities which he studied at and worked in between the early 1960s and 1970s.

In 2011 he was awarded an honorary doctorate from the University of West Australia in Perth. In February 2013 in a ceremony in Jakarta attended by the president of Indonesia and a delegation from Monash University led by the Vice-Chancellor of the university, he was awarded an honorary Doctor of Laws from Monash University. And in November 2013 he was awarded an honorary doctorate from the Australian National University in Canberra.

Publications and papers

Since his appointment as a staff member in the Faculty of Economics, Gadjah Mada University, in the early 1970s, Boediono has lectured and published widely on topics relating to contemporary issues of economic policy in Indonesia.  His publications include the following.

Boediono. 2009.  Ekonomi Indonesia, mau ke mana? Kumpulan esai ekonomi (The economy of Indonesia, Where to? A collection of economic essays), PT Gramedia, Jakarta.  
Boediono. 2007. 'Primus Inter Pares', Chapter 11 in Moh. Arsjad Anwar, Aris Ananta, Ari Kuncoro (eds), Kesan Para Sahabat tentang Widjojo Nitisastro (Testimonials of Friends about Widjojo Nitisastro), Penerbit Buku Kompas, Jakarta.
Boediono, 2005. 'Professor Mubyarto, 1938–2005', Bulletin of Indonesian Economic Studies, 41 (2).
Boediono. 2005. 'Managing the Indonesian economy: some lessons from the past', Bulletin of Indonesian Economic Studies, 41 (3).
Boediono. 2004. 'Kebijakan fiskal: sekarang dan selanjutnya' (Fiscal policy: now and in the future), in Subiyantoro, Heru and Riphat Singgih (eds), Kebijakan fiskal (Fiscal policy), Penerbit Buku Kompas, Jakarta.
Boediono. 2002. 'The IMF support program in Indonesia: comparing its implementation under three presidents', Bulletin of Indonesian Economic Studies, 38 (3).
Boediono. 1999. 'Addressing the social impacts', speech delivered to the meeting on Development cooperation: responding to the Asian crisis, Sydney, 5 March.
Boediono and T. Kaneko. 1998. 'Price changes', in S. Ichimura (ed.), Indonesian economic development: Issues and analysis, Japanese International Cooperation Agency, Tokyo.
Boediono. 1990. 'Fiscal policy in Indonesia'. Paper presented to the second convention of the East Asian Economic Association, Bandung.
Boediono and Mari Pangestu (1986). 'The structure and causes of manufacturing sector protection in Indonesia', in Christopher Findlay and Ross Garnaut (eds.), The political economy of manufacturing protection: experience of ASEAN and Australia, Allen and Unwin, Australia.
Boediono. 1985. 'Demand for Money in Indonesia, 1975 - 1984', Bulletin of Indonesian Economic Studies, 21 (2). 
Boediono. 1974. 'An economic survey of D.I Aceh',Bulletin of Indonesian Economic Studies, 10 (2).
Boediono. 1972. 'An economic survey of North Sulawesi', Bulletin of Indonesian Economic Studies, 8 (3).

Decorations 
As the vice president of Indonesia, Boediono is automatically bestowed the highest class of six out of seven civilian Star Decorations, namely:

Additional reading

 Son Yuwono. 2009.  Boediono "Titisan" Soekarno dari Blitar [Boediono a "Reincarnation" of Soekarno from Blitar].  Jakarta: Golden Terayon Press, .

See also
List of vice presidents of Indonesia

References

External links

1943 births
Finance Ministers of Indonesia
Government ministers of Indonesia
Governors of Bank Indonesia
Academic staff of Gadjah Mada University
20th-century Indonesian economists
Indonesian Muslims
Javanese people
Living people
Monash University alumni
People from Blitar
University of Western Australia alumni
Vice presidents of Indonesia
Wharton School of the University of Pennsylvania alumni
21st-century Indonesian economists